Nokpul is a census town in the Habra I CD block in the Barasat sadar subdivision in the North 24 Parganas district in the Indian state of West Bengal.

Geography

Location

Nokpul, Gobardanga, Habra  form a cluster of census towns, south part of Gobardanga. The Jamuna separates Gobardanga from this cluster. Habra police station serves this area.

Area overview
The area covered in the map alongside is largely a part of the north Bidyadhari Plain. located in the lower Ganges Delta. The country is flat. It is a little raised above flood level and the highest ground borders the river channels.54.67% of the people of the densely populated area lives in the urban areas and 45.33% lives in the rural  areas.

Note: The map alongside presents some of the notable locations in the subdivision. All places marked in the map are linked in the larger full screen map.

Demographics
According to the 2011 Census of India, Nokpul had a total population of 7,737, of which 4,030 (52%) were males and 3,707 (48%) were females. Population in the age range 0-6 years was 671. The total number of literate persons in Nokpul was 6,047 (85.58% of the population over 6 years).

 India census, Nokpul had a population of 6647. Males constitute 53% of the population and females 47%. Nokpul has an average literacy rate of 81%, higher than the national average of 59.5%: male literacy is 85%, and female literacy is 77%. In Nokpul, 9% of the population is under 6 years of age.

Economy

Commuters
As per 2011 census, a large proportion of people in Habra I CD block earn their livelihood as ‘other workers’, which include office, factory and transport workers, professionals and business people and so on. (See Habra I for details). Around a total of 32 lakh people from all around the city commute to Kolkata daily for work. In the Sealdah-Bangaon section there are 58 trains that carry commuters from 24 railway stations. In the Seadah-Hasnabad sections 32 trains carry commuters from 30 stations.

Infrastructure
As per District Census Handbook 2011, Nokpul covered an area of 1.71 km2. It had 6 primary schools, 1 middle school, 1 secondary school and 1 senior secondary school. The nearest degree college was located 4 km away at Gobardanga. The nearest hospital was 12 km, the nearest dispensary/ health centre was 8 km away, the nearest family welfare centre was 12 km away, the nearest maternity and child welfare centre was 12 km away and the nearest maternity home was 12 km away.

Transport
Nokpul is beside State Highway 3.

Machhalandapur railway station, located nearby at Maslandapur, on the Sealdah-Bangaon branch line, is 53.5 km from Sealdah and is part of the Kolkata Suburban Railway system.

Education
Gobardanga Hindu College at Gobardanga is located nearby.

Healthcare
Maslandapur Rural Hospital at Maslandapur with 30 beds, located nearby, functions as the main medical facility in Habra I CD Block.

North 24 Parganas district has been identified as one of the areas where ground water is affected by arsenic contamination.

See also
Map of Habra I CD Block on Page 289 of District Census Handbook.

References

Cities and towns in North 24 Parganas district